William Farquhar Barry (August 18, 1818 – July 18, 1879) was a career officer in the United States Army, serving as an artillery commander during the Mexican–American War and Civil War.

Birth and early years
Born in New York City, Barry graduated from the United States Military Academy in 1838, 17th in his class of 45 cadets. He was commissioned a brevet second lieutenant in the 4th U.S. Artillery, transferring to the 2nd U.S. Artillery a few weeks later. He was stationed near the Canada–US border, then later took part in the Mexican–American, Seminole, and the Kansas-Missouri Border Wars.

Military career
He was the co-author of Instruction for Field Artillery (1860), along with William H. French and Henry J. Hunt.

Promoted to major of artillery shortly after the start of hostilities between the Union and the Confederacy, Barry served as Brig. Gen. Irvin McDowell's chief of artillery during the First Battle of Bull Run, where his position was overrun after mistaking advancing Confederates for retreating Union forces. Barry was appointed brigadier general by President Abraham Lincoln on August 20, 1861, to rank from August 20, 1861. President Lincoln submitted the nomination to the U.S. Senate on December 21, 1861 and the Senate confirmed it on March 17, 1862. Barry came up with the concept that became the U.S. Horse Artillery Brigade in the Army of the Potomac.

As chief of artillery under Maj. Gen. George B. McClellan, Barry organized ordnance for the Army of the Potomac and, during the Peninsula Campaign, later took part in the battles of Yorktown, Mechanicsville, Gaines' Mill, White Oak Swamp, and Malvern Hill.

After later supervising forts and ordnance surrounding Washington, D.C., Barry became chief of artillery under Maj. Gen. William T. Sherman, serving with him in Tennessee, the March to the Sea, and the Carolinas Campaign. On January 23, 1865, President Lincoln nominated Barry for appointment to the brevet grade of major general of volunteers, to rank from September 1, 1864, for his service in the Atlanta Campaign, and the U.S. Senate confirmed the appointment on February 14, 1865. Barry was mustered out of the volunteer force on January 15, 1866. On July 17, 1866, President Andrew Johnson nominated Barry for appointment to the brevet grade of major general in the Regular Army, to rank from March 13, 1865, and the U.S. Senate confirmed the appointment on July 23, 1866.

On December 11, 1865, Barry was appointed colonel in the 2nd U.S. Artillery, and was in command of the northern frontier during the Fenian raids of 1866. He served there until September 1867, and then commanded the artillery school of practice at Fort Monroe until March 1877, when he was appointed to the command at Fort McHenry, Baltimore, Maryland. During the labor riots of 1877 he rendered valuable service at Camden Station.

Barry died at Fort McHenry and is buried at Forest Lawn Cemetery in Buffalo, New York.

See also

List of American Civil War generals (Union)

Notes

References
 Eicher, John H., and Eicher, David J., Civil War High Commands, Stanford University Press, 2001, .
 Linedecker, Clifford L., ed., Civil War, A-Z: The Complete Handbook of America's Bloodiest Conflict, New York: Ballantine Books, 2002, 

Attribution

External links

Union Generals - General William Farquhar Barry, USA

 William Farquhar Barry biography at Defense Technical Information Center

1818 births
1879 deaths
Military personnel from New York City
United States Military Academy alumni
Union Army generals
People of New York (state) in the American Civil War
People of the Fenian raids
Burials at Forest Lawn Cemetery (Buffalo)